A list of alumni of Hertford College, Oxford, including alumni of its two predecessor institutions, Hart Hall and Magdalen Hall.

Hart Hall (1282–1740) 

 Joseph Bowles, Bodley's Librarian
 Thomas Bray, clergyman and abolitionist
 Saint Alexander Briant, Jesuit martyr
 Henry Bromley, politician
 Morgan Coleman, MP for Newport, Cornwall
 John Donne, poet, Anglican priest
 Payne Fisher, poet
 Nicholas Fuller, Hebraist, philologist
 John Glynne, jurist
 Peter Heylyn, polemicist
 John Hutchins, antiquary
 Thomas Manton, Puritan clergyman and chaplain to Oliver Cromwell
 John Norden, cartographer
 Henry Pelham, British Whig Prime Minister
 John Selden, jurist, MP for Oxford University
 George Augustus Selwyn, politician
 Thomas Shirley, politician, soldier, adventurer, and privateer
 Jonathan Swift, satirist, poet, Anglican priest, author of Gulliver's Travels
 Henry Swinburne, ecclesiastical lawyer

Hertford College, first foundation 1740–1816 

 Charles James Fox, Whig statesman
 John Hippisley, politician, diplomat

Magdalen Hall, old site 1480–1822 

 Robert Ashley, writer
 Daniel Burgess, Presbyterian minister
 Matthew Bryan, Jacobite preacher
 Walter Charleton, Epicurean philosopher
 Samuel Daniel, poet, historian
 Matthew Hale, Lord Chief Justice
 Thomas Hobbes, political philosopher, author of Leviathan
 John Huckell, poet
 Edward Hyde, 1st Earl of Clarendon, historian, statesman
 John Gilbert, Archbishop of York
 Narcissus Marsh, Primate of All Ireland 
 Richard Morton, physician
 Philip Nye, clergyman and member of the Westminster Assembly of Divines
 Robert Plot, naturalist, first Professor of Chemistry at the University of Oxford, and first Keeper of the Ashmolean Museum
 John Rickman, statistician 
 Obadiah Sedgwick, clergyman and member of the Westminster Assembly of Divines
 George Shaw, biologist
 Fleetwood Sheppard, courtier
 William Tyndale, Bible translator, Reformation martyr
 Henry Vane the Younger, Parliamentarian statesman
 Sir Ralph Verney, 1st Baronet, of Middle Claydon, politician
 William Waller, Parliamentarian soldier
 John Wilkins, naturalist, Warden of Wadham College, Oxford, and founder of the Royal Society
 Benjamin Woodbridge, clergyman and controversialist

Magdalen Hall, new site 1822–1874 
 Montagu Burrows,  first Chichele Professor of Modern History
 William Robinson Clark, theologian
 William Cowper, first Dean of Sydney
 John Thadeus Delane, journalist
 Clement Jackson, founder of the Amateur Athletic Association
 Arthur Mayo VC, soldier
 Francis McDougall, first Anglican bishop of Labuan and the Kingdom of Sarawak
 Brownlow North, evangelist
 Thorold Rogers, political economist
 William Williams, first Anglican Bishop of Waiapu, New Zealand
 Leonard Williams, third Bishop of Waiapu (son of William Williams)
 Nathaniel Woodard, Priest in the Church of England, founder of the Woodard Corporation

Hertford College, second foundation 1874– 
 Richard Addinsell, composer of film music
 Helen Alexander, businesswoman
 C. A. J. Armstrong, historian
 Sharon Ashbrook, chemist
 Bernard Ashmole, archaeologist, art historian
 Andrea Ashworth, author, academic
 Edmund Bartley-Denniss, politician and cyclist 
 Charles Bean, war correspondent and historian
 John Behan, educationist, jurist
 Marian Bell, economist
 Catherine Bennett, journalist
 David Blomfield, leader of the Liberal Party group on Richmond upon Thames Council, writer, book editor and local historian
 Martin Bridson, mathematician
 Isaac Hawkins Browne, industrialist
 Fiona Bruce, BBC newsreader
 Rupert Bruce-Mitford, archaeologist and scholar
 Anthony Bushell, actor
  Carole Cadwalladr, journalist
 Walter Carey, clergyman
 Victor Cha, national security specialist 
 Jean Chapdelaine, diplomat
 Calvin Cheng, Singapore modelling agency head, former Nominated Member of Parliament
 William Robinson Clark, theologian
 Nick Cohen, political journalist
 Geoffrey Corbett, civil servant and mountaineer
 W. Maxwell Cowan, neuroscientist
 Sherard Cowper-Coles, diplomat
 George Dangerfield, journalist, historian
 Daniel Dennett, philosopher of the mind
 David Dilks, historian
 Jack Herbert Driberg, anthropologist
 Bill Duff, arabist
 Jack Duppa-Miller, sailor
 Alfred Earle, bishop
 J. Meade Falkner, novelist, The Lost Stradivarius
 Richard W. Fisher, diplomat
 Warren Fisher, civil servant
 Adam Fleming, BBC newsreader
 Thomas Fletcher, diplomat
 Nicholas Foulkes, historian, journalist
 Henry Sanderson Furniss, 1st Baron Sanderson, socialist educationalist
Helen Ghosh, Master of Balliol College, Oxford, former Director-General of the National Trust.
 Pinny Grylls, film director
 Krishnan Guru-Murthy, Channel 4 newsreader
 Gideon Henderson, geochemist, climate-change scientist
 Nicholas Henderson, diplomat
 Jeremy Heywood, civil servant
 Leonard Hodgson, church historian
 Jeffrey John, Dean of St Alban's Cathedral
James John Joicey, amateur entomologist
 Mark S. Joshi, financial mathematician
 Natasha Kaplinsky, ITN newsreader
 Soweto Kinch, jazz saxophonist, rapper
 Seth Lerer, literary critic
 Alain LeRoy Locke, writer of the Harlem Renaissance
 Jurek Martin, journalist
 Ronald Martland, former justice of the Supreme Court of Canada
 Khalid Jawed Khan, Attorney General of Pakistan
 Gavin Maxwell, naturalist, author of Ring of Bright Water
 Arthur Mayo, recipient of the Victoria Cross
 Roland Michener, former Governor General of Canada
 Dom Mintoff, former Prime Minister of Malta
 David Naylor, medical researcher
 Edward Max Nicholson, founder of the World Wildlife Fund
 Richard Norton-Taylor, journalist, playwright
 Elizabeth Norton, historian and author
 Richard Parsons, founder of CGP Guides
 Peter Pears, tenor
 Barbara A. Perry, constitutional lawyer
 James Pettifer, scholar of the Balkans
 Bridget Phillipson, MP for Houghton and Sunderland South
 Joseph Gordon Saunders, composer
 Jacqui Smith, former British Home Secretary
 David Spedding, former Head of MI6
 Manisha Tank, CNN newsreader
 Thum Ping Tjin, the first Singaporean to swim the English Channel
 Ed Vulliamy, journalist and world reporter
 Evelyn Waugh, author of Brideshead Revisited, journalist
 Byron White, U.S. Associate Supreme Court Justice
 Athol Williams, South African poet and social philosopher
 Tobias Wolff, author of This Boy's Life
 Nathaniel Woodard, educationalist
 Alison Young, legal scholar, Sir David Williams Professor of Public Law at the University of Cambridge
Maisie Richardson-Sellers, actor
Roger Westbrook, diplomat

Notes

 
 
 
Hertford alumni
People associated with Hertford College, Oxford